Yowabu (Joab) Magada Kawaluuko (7 January 1930 – 29 July 2016), was a Ugandan educator and politician. He served as the Chairman of Uganda People's Congress in charge of Greater Kamuli District, in the first and second Uganda People's Congress (UPC) governments. He was a founder member of the Uganda National Congress, which eventually became UPC, under Apollo Obote. He also served on the National Executive Committee in between 1980 and 1985. He was a practicing Anglican Christian.

Early life
Yowabu Magada Kawaluuko nicknamed commander was born on 7 January 1930. to Enos Muwalu Kizige, a farmer, and Amina Kawala Namusubo Tibagonzeka, a house wife, of Nabirumba village, Kamuli district, Uganda. The second born after his older brother Samuel who was born ten years prior (born 1920), Kawaluuko attended Nabirumba Church Of Uganda Primary School, after which he went to Balawoli, Kaliro, and then to Namulikya where he sat his Primary Leaving Examinations.

Yowabu went on to attend Bishop Willis Teacher Training College and later to Kaliro where he trained as vernacular teacher in 1951.
Kawaluuko taught in Kagulu, Kigingi, Nsale, Irundu, Bugaya, Buyende and Nabirumba, first as a grade 3 teacher, deputy and then head teacher, before his retirement in 1993 at the age of 63.

Marriage
Yowabu was married twice, first in 1956 to Ruth Mercy Tabingwa Kawaluuko (14 July 1937 – 9 May 1979 her death) and later to Monica Mukoda Kawaluuko (1980–2016).

Issue
Elizabeth Robinah Jessica Nakaima Nkuutu (29 October 1957 – 7 October 1994), Monica Mercy Ruth Tibagonzeka Alaba TOGA (26 March 1960 – 17 September 1996), Mildred Flavia Sarah Batwalizawo (1972 – June 1975), Hon Moses Kizige MP (born 1962) a serving member of The Ugandan government Cabinet, Rosette Muzigo Morrison (LLM) (born 1964), a senior lawyer with the International Criminal Court (ICC) at the Hague, Annette Mwende Kawaluuko(August 7, 1976 (Kamuli)-July 25, 2020,Milton Keynes United Kingdom), Olivia Lawele née Nambi(1966-). Kawaluuko was also father to 13 other children.

Death and afterward
In late 2015, Kawaluuko was diagnosed with testicular cancer, which was too advanced to completely clear on treatment. He died in Kampala on 30 July 2016, having collapsed on the way to Kampala international hospital, for a routine check up in relation to complications of a recently discovered tumour in his right ear.

His death came as complete shock to most, despite his ill health and it led to complete out pouring of grief seen in the tens of thousands of people that descended on Nabirumba village, Kamuli, Uganda to pay their last respects, effectively turning the place into a temporary shrine.

Following a thanks giving service at Saint Andrew's church Bukoto in Kamapala on 3 August, Kawaluuko was laid to rest on Thursday 4 August 2016 in his ancestral home of Nabirumba. His funeral was attended by high ranking state officials, the clergy and the judiciary, including 12 government ministers led by the Deputy Prime Minister Kirunda Kivejinja and 30 members of parliament, three judges and three bishops were all in attendance, which was fitting given his contribution and position as one of the most influential Ugandan politicians in the 60 years leading up to his death.

Philosophical and/or political views
Kawaluuko was a strong supporter of Uganda Peoples Congress and The National Resistance Movement in his late years. He was a Christian by faith.

External links

Uganda People's Congress politicians
1930 births
2016 deaths